Richard Powell (born 9 December 1960) is an Australian rower. He competed at the 1988 Summer Olympics and the 1992 Summer Olympics.

References

External links
 

1960 births
Living people
Australian male rowers
Olympic rowers of Australia
Rowers at the 1988 Summer Olympics
Rowers at the 1992 Summer Olympics
Place of birth missing (living people)
Commonwealth Games medallists in rowing
Rowers at the 1986 Commonwealth Games
Commonwealth Games silver medallists for Australia
Medallists at the 1986 Commonwealth Games
20th-century Australian people